Kim Jin-hyun (born 29 July 1987) is a South Korean football player who played for Bucheon FC.

References

External links 
 

1987 births
Living people
South Korean footballers
Jeonnam Dragons players
Gyeongnam FC players
Daejeon Hana Citizen FC players
Bucheon FC 1995 players
Hwaseong FC players
K League 1 players
K League 2 players
Korea National League players
K3 League players
Association football midfielders
Association football fullbacks
Sportspeople from North Jeolla Province